The second season of the CBS police procedural drama series Hawaii Five-0 premiered on September 19, 2011 for the 2011–12 television season. CBS renewed the series for a 23 episode second season on May 15, 2011. Two fictional crossovers with NCIS: Los Angeles occurred during the season in episodes six and twenty-one. The season concluded on May 14, 2012.

The series continues to center on the Five-0 Task Force, a specialized police state task force established by the Hawaiian Governor that investigates a wide series of crimes on the islands, including murder, terrorism, and human trafficking. The second season introduces a new governor, after the murder of his predecessor. However, unlike the previous governor, the new one orders changes to the task force. Taryn Manning did not return as a main cast member however, did make a guest appearance. In addition, the season includes two new main cast members, Masi Oka, who recurred in the first season, and Lauren German, who debuted in episode two and began receiving an "Also starring" credit in episode five. German departed after episode sixteen. Alex O'Loughlin missed some filming as he was seeking drug treatment for pain management medication during the production season.

The second season ranked #26 for the 2011-12 television season, had an average of 11.83 million viewers, and received mostly positive reviews. "Haʻiʻole", the season premiere, brought in the most viewers for the season with 12.19 million; meanwhile, the season finale, "Ua Hala" had the fourth highest amount with 11.42 million. The series was also renewed for a third season on March 14, 2012 which later premiered on September 24.

Cast and characters

Main cast
 Alex O'Loughlin as Lieutenant Commander Steven "Steve" McGarrett, United States Navy Reserve
 Scott Caan as Detective Sergeant Daniel "Danny" "Danno" Williams, Honolulu Police Department
 Daniel Dae Kim as Detective Lieutenant Chin Ho Kelly, Honolulu Police Department
 Grace Park as Officer Kono Kalakaua, Honolulu Police Department
 Masi Oka as Dr. Max Bergman, Chief Medical Examiner
 Lauren German as Special Agent Lori Weston, Department of Homeland Security assigned to the Five-0 Task Force

Recurring

 Mark Dacascos as Wo Fat
 Reiko Aylesworth as Dr. Malia Waincroft
 William Baldwin as Frank Delano
 Dennis Chun as HPD Sergeant Duke Lukela
 Ian Anthony Dale as Adam Noshimuri
 Teilor Grubbs as Grace Williams
 Richard T. Jones as Governor Sam Denning
 Terry O'Quinn as Lieutenant Commander Joe White
 Larisa Oleynik as Jenna Kaye
 Autumn Reeser as Dr. Gabrielle Asano
 Tom Sizemore as Capt. Vincent Fryer
 Taylor Wily as Kamekona Tupuola
 Brian Yang as Che "Charlie" Fong

Guest stars
 Ed Asner as August March
 Annie Wersching as Samantha Martel
 Jimmy Buffett as Frank Bama
 James Caan as Tony Archer
 Patty Duke as Sylvia Spencer
 Robert Englund as Samuel Lee
 Dennis Miller as Bobby Raines
 Michelle Borth as Lieutenant Catherine Rollins
 William Sadler as John McGarrett
 Taryn Manning as Mary Ann McGarrett
 Claire van der Boom as Rachel Edwards
 David Keith as Commanding Officer Wade Gutches
 Will Yun Lee as Sang Min Sooh

Crossover characters
 Daniela Ruah as Kensi Blye
 LL Cool J as Sam Hanna
 Chris O'Donnell as G. Callen
 Craig Robert Young as Dracul Comescu

Episodes

The number in the "No. overall" column refers to the episode's number within the overall series, whereas the number in the "No. in season" column refers to the episode's number within this particular season. The titles of each episode are in the Hawaiian language, though its English translations are directly underneath. "Production Code" refers to the order in which the episodes were produced. "U.S. viewers (millions)" refers to the number of viewers in the US in millions who watched the episode as it was aired.

Crossovers 
The season featured two crossovers with NCIS: Los Angeles. The first crossover event took place in the sixth episode, entitled "Ka Hakaka Maikaʻi" (or "The Good Fight" in English), Daniela Ruah made a guest appearance as her NCIS: LA character Kensi Blye; the episode aired on October 24, 2011. The second event took place in the form of a two-part crossover. Chris O’Donnell and LL Cool J appeared as G. Callen and Sam Hanna in the twenty-first episode of the season titled "Pa Make Loa" ("Touch of Death") on April 30, 2012. In the second part, Scott Caan and Daniel Dae Kim appeared in the NCIS: Los Angeles third season episode "Touch of Death" which aired on May 1, 2012.

Production

Development
On May 15, 2011, CBS renewed Hawaii Five-0 for a second season which premiered on CBS on September 19, 2011. Filming for the season began on July 11, 2011 with a traditional Hawaiian blessing. As of March 2, 2012 the twentieth episode was being filmed and production was ahead of schedule. On March 14, 2012 the series was renewed for a third season. The season concluded airing on May 14, 2012.

Casting
Taryn Manning is the only main cast member to not return after departing the series in the middle first season; however, she did reprise her role as Mary Ann McGarrett as a guest star in the nineteenth episode of the season. On May 16, 2011 while the first season was still airing it was announced that Masi Oka, who recurred as medical examiner Max Bergman, would be promoted to a main cast member for the second season. It was reported on June 21, 2011 that Terry O'Quinn was cast as a Navy Seal Lt. Commander, meanwhile on June 27, 2011 it was announced that Tom Sizemore would recur in a multi-episode story arc throughout the season. On July 12, 2011 it was announced that Lauren German had been cast in a recurring role, beginning in the second episode, as Special Agent Lori Weston, a potential love interest for Alex O'Loughlin's character Steve McGarrett. She was later upgraded to a series regular beginning with the fifth episode. Larisa Oleynik who also recurred in the first season reprised her role as former CIA operative Jenna Kaye William Baldwin also guest starred in a multi-episode story arc. On August 18, 2011 it was reported that Daniela Ruah would guest star in a crossover episode as her NCIS: Los Angeles character Kensi Blye. In episode nineteen, Ed Asner reprised his role as August March from the original series episode "Wooden Model of a Rat:, footage from the episode was used for March's second appearance. During a second crossover event later in the season LL Cool J and Chris O'Donnell also appeared in an episode as their respective NCIS: Los Angeles characters Sam Hanna and G. Callen. On March 2, 2012, CBS announced that O'Loughlin would miss shooting some episodes of Hawaii Five-0 to seek drug treatment related to pain management medication prescribed after a shoulder injury. He makes a brief appearance in episode twenty and does not appear at all in episode twenty-one. German departed the series in the sixteenth episode and was subsequently cast in Chicago Fire.

Release and marketing
On July 12, 2011 it was announced that the season would have an advanced premiere screening on September 10. The annual event known as "Sunset on the Beach", featured a red carpet and interviews with the cast and crew at Waikiki beach in Honolulu, Hawaii. When CBS released their fall schedule on May 18, 2011 it was revealed that the series would keep its time slot from the first season and continue airing on Mondays at 10 p.m. Eastern Time.

Reception

Critical response

Kevin Yeoman with Screen Rant stated about the series premiere "Hawaii Five-0 managed to do what it does best in the season 2 opener: move at such breakneck speed that the audience hardly has time to recognize the implausibility of it all" and that "The plot of ‘Ha'i'ole’ is paper-thin, as are the majority of the characters and their motivations". Jim Garner at TV Fanatic says "I have to hand it to Peter Lenkov, he certainly knows how to shake things up and give us a dramatic ending".

Awards and nominations
On May 18, 2012, it was announced that the series had been nominated for three Teen Choice Awards at the 2012 Teen Choice Awards ceremony. Hawaii Five-0 as a whole received its second nomination for Choice Action Series. Daniel Dae Kim and Grace Park both received their second nomination for Choice TV Actor Action and Choice TV Actress Action respectively. All three nominations were lost. As part of the Creative Arts Emmy Awards at the 64th Primetime Creative Arts Emmy Awards, stunt coordinator Jeff Cadiente was nominated for an Emmy Award in "Outstanding Stunt Coordination" for the episode "Kameʻe". Composers Keith Power and Brian Tyler won the "BMI TV Music Award" at the 2012 BMI awards.

Ratings

Home video release

References

External links
 
 
 List of Hawaii Five-0 episodes at The Futon Critic
 

2011 American television seasons
2012 American television seasons
Hawaii Five-0 (2010 TV series) seasons